Euclasta splendidalis is a species of moth in the family Crambidae. The species was first described by Gottlieb August Wilhelm Herrich-Schäffer in 1848. It is found in Romania, Bulgaria, the Republic of Macedonia, Greece, Russia, Asia Minor, Turkmenistan, Azerbaijan and Armenia. It has been recorded from Malta, but this is a misidentification of Euclasta varii.

The wingspan is about 32 mm.

References

Moths described in 1848
Pyraustinae
Moths of Europe
Moths of Asia